Sabeya Airport is a military airport located at Kandh Gopi Village in Gopalganj District, Bihar. It is under control of Defence Ministry of India. But here is not any military and forces.

History
It was built by Defence Ministry of British-India Government... It is very sensitive for defence because it is close to the China Border. It was used by British Air Force in World War II

UDAN Scheme
The Government of India has sanctioned to start air service of 26 airport under regional connectivity scheme UDAN: it is under it. Recently Gopalganj MP raised question on it in Parliament. The Ministry of Civil Aviation (India) requested a report from the Defence Ministry.

See also
Patna Airport
Darbhanga Airport
Muzaffarpur Airport
Gaya Airport
Purnea Airport
Raxaul Airport

References

History of Hathua Sabaya Airport of Gopalganj

External links

Defunct airports in India
Military airbases
Airports in Bihar
1868 establishments in India